Oreské is a village and municipality in Michalovce District in the Kosice Region of eastern Slovakia.

History
In historical records the village was first mentioned in 1358.

Geography
The village lies at an altitude of 165 metres and covers an area of 11.13 km². The municipality has a population of about 490 people.

Culture
The village has a public library and a football pitch.

Gallery

External links

https://web.archive.org/web/20071027094149/http://www.statistics.sk/mosmis/eng/run.html 

Villages and municipalities in Michalovce District